Senaud is a former commune in the Jura department in the Bourgogne-Franche-Comté region in eastern France. On 1 January 2016, it was merged into the commune of Val-d'Épy. Its population was 51 in 2019.

See also
Communes of the Jura department

References

Former communes of Jura (department)